Mahjabeen Morshed (born 22 March 1969) is a Jatiya Party politician and a former Jatiya Sangsad member from women reserved seats.

Career
Morshed was elected to parliament from women reserve seat-45 in 2014 as a Jatiya Party candidate. On 10 January 2018, Bangladesh Anti-Corruption Commission sued her and her husband, Murad Ibrahim, for embezzling 2.75 billion taka from BASIC Bank Limited. Her husband is the Managing Director of Crystal Steel and Ship Breaking Limited; the loans were taken under the company name. She served as the President of Chittagong City unit of Jatiya Party but was removed from the post after she was sued by Bangladesh Anti-Corruption Commission.

References

Living people
1969 births
Jatiya Party politicians
9th Jatiya Sangsad members
10th Jatiya Sangsad members
Women members of the Jatiya Sangsad
Place of birth missing (living people)
21st-century Bangladeshi women politicians